Policarpa may refer to:
 Policarpa Salavarrieta, heroine of the Colombian independence movement against the Spanish Empire
 Policarpa Salavarrieta, a neighbourhood of the locality of Bogotá Antonio Nariño
 Policarpa Salavarrieta Front, the 23rd front of the Middle Magdalena Bloc of the FARC-EP

Geography 
 Policarpa, Nariño, a municipality in the Colombian department of Nariño

Biology 
 Polycarpa, a genus of sea squirts